Roseville is an unincorporated community in Hancock County, Kentucky, United States.

References

Unincorporated communities in Hancock County, Kentucky
Unincorporated communities in Kentucky